Aftab Uddin Mollah, also known as Aftabuddin, is an Indian National Congress politician from Assam.He is a member of Assam Legislative Assembly from Jaleswar constituency. He was member of the Assam Legislative Assembly for the Jaleswar constituency from 2001 to 2006.

References

Year of birth missing (living people)
Living people
Indian National Congress politicians from Assam
Assam Legislative Assembly
People from Goalpara district